There have been five baronetcies created for persons with the surname Green, one in the Baronetage of England, one in the Baronetage of Great Britain and three in the Baronetage of the United Kingdom. Only one creation is extant as of 2007.

The Green Baronetcy, of Sampford in the County of Essex, was created in the Baronetage of England on 26 July 1660 for Edward Green. The title became extinct on his death in 1676.

The Green Baronetcy, of Marass in the County of Durham, was created in the Baronetage of Great Britain on 27 June 1786 for William Green. The title became extinct on the death of the second Baronet in 1826.

The Green Baronetcy, of Milnrow in the County of York, was created in the Baronetage of the United Kingdom on 5 December 1805 for Charles Green. The title became extinct on his death in 1831.

The Green Baronetcy, of Wakefield in the County of York, and of Ken Hill in the parish of Snettisham in the County of Norfolk, was created in the Baronetage of the United Kingdom on 5 March 1886 for Edward Green, Conservative Member of Parliament for Wakefield. The second baronet became involved in the Royal Baccarat Scandal of 1890. The fourth Baronet was a deputy lieutenant and high sheriff of Norfolk and was a member of the Norfolk County Council.

The Green Baronetcy, of Belsize Park Gardens in the Metropolitan Borough of Hampstead in the County of London, was created in the Baronetage of the United Kingdom on 19 December 1901 for Frank Green, Lord Mayor of London from 1900 to 1901. The title became extinct on the death of the fourth Baronet in 1959.

Green baronets, of Sampford (1660)

Sir Edward Green, 1st Baronet (died 1676)

Green baronets, of Marass (1786)
Sir William Green, 1st Baronet (1725–1811)
Sir Justly Watson Green, 2nd Baronet (1755–1826)

Green baronets, of Milnrow (1805)
Sir Charles Green, 1st Baronet (died 1831)

Green baronets, of Wakefield (1886)

Sir Edward Green, 1st Baronet (1831–1923)
Sir Edward Lycett Green, 2nd Baronet (1860–1940)
Sir Edward Arthur Lycett Green, 3rd Baronet (1886–1941)
Sir Edward Stephen Lycett Green, 4th Baronet (1910–1996)
Sir Simon Lycett Green, 5th Baronet (1912–2003)
Sir Edward Patrick Lycett Green, 6th Baronet (born 1950)

Green baronets, of Belsize Park (1901)
Sir Frank Green, 1st Baronet (1835–1902)
Sir Francis Haydn Green, 2nd Baronet (1871–1956)
Sir Leonard Henry Haydn Green, 3rd Baronet (1879–1958)
Sir George Arthur Haydn Green, 4th Baronet (1884–1959)

Notes

References
Kidd, Charles, Williamson, David (editors). Debrett's Peerage and Baronetage (1990 edition). New York: St Martin's Press, 1990, 

Baronetcies in the Baronetage of the United Kingdom
Extinct baronetcies in the Baronetage of England
Extinct baronetcies in the Baronetage of Great Britain
Extinct baronetcies in the Baronetage of the United Kingdom
1660 establishments in England